William Robert Symonds (1851 – 7 November 1934) was an English painter. He specialised in genre scenes, often sentimental, or involving children and animals.

Life
Born in Yoxford, Suffolk, he studied in Antwerp and settled in London in 1881. He exhibited regularly at the Royal Academy from 1876. His son was the architect and furniture expert Robert Wemyss Symonds.

Works
Symonds painted the originals for some famous prints, the most notable being Heather, painted c. 1909.

His paintings hang in the Wallace Collection in London and Christchurch Mansion in Suffolk. Twenty-two of his oil painting portraits are in UK public collections, in particular Colchester and Ipswich Museums.

Paintings 

 Heather
 Girl with a Silver Fish
 A painting of Sir Richard Wallace, 1885
 Babes in the Wood
 Family Group Portrait of Mr, Mrs and Master Hollond of Benhall Lodge, 1887
 His Lordship
 Portret kobiety, 1901
 An illustration for The Frog Prince
 Portrait of Clarice H. Edwards as young girl, 1904
 Portrait of Mr Arthur Ross and Companion portrait of his wife
 Indian Elephant, 1918

Notes

External links

1851 births
1934 deaths
19th-century English painters
English male painters
20th-century English painters
People from Yoxford
Royal Society of Portrait Painters
20th-century English male artists
19th-century English male artists